Milmoral, also known as the H.G. Fetterolf House, John & Elizabeth Eagleson House and Ruth Nissen House, is a historic home located at Cheltenham Township, Montgomery County, Pennsylvania. The house was built in 1905–06, and is a -story, five-bay, L-shaped dwelling in the Colonial Revival style. It is built of Wissahickon schist and was remodeled and enlarged in 1912.  The house features a hipped roof, wraparound porch supported by Doric order columns. Also on the property are a contributing stable / carriage house and greenhouse.

It was added to the National Register of Historic Places in 2003.

References

Houses on the National Register of Historic Places in Pennsylvania
Colonial Revival architecture in Pennsylvania
Houses completed in 1912
Houses in Montgomery County, Pennsylvania
Cheltenham Township, Pennsylvania
1912 establishments in Pennsylvania
National Register of Historic Places in Montgomery County, Pennsylvania